Ritsu may refer to:

 Vinaya, the Japanese term for the Buddhist regulatory framework
 Risshū (Buddhism), a name of a Japanese school of Buddhism strictly following this framework
 the historical Japanese term for a criminal code as part of the Ritsuryō law system

People with the given name
, Japanese footballer

Fictional characters 

 Ritsu (律), a character in the manga series Assassination Classroom.

Japanese masculine given names